Mitch Goudy (born November 2, 1994), also known as "Rowdie" Mitch Goudy, is an American country singer, songwriter, guitarist, and record producer from Iowa. He records on Third Floor Records. In 2014, Goudy was on the Country Music Association “Who New to Watch” list.

Early life
Goudy was born in Iowa. His early influences included Eric Church, Garth Brooks and Willie Nelson. Goudy's Fatherwas the sound man for the raceway in Eldon, IA.

Career
Goudy records on the independent label Third Floor Records. In November 2013, he released his first single, "Blow These Speakers Out." His second single, “Ain’t My Fault”  was released in June 2014. and was coupled by his first official music video. Goudy has opened for The Oak Ridge Boys, Rodney Atkins, and Joe Nichols.

Discography

Albums
 Wild (2013)
 #Rowdie (2014)

Singles

Music videos

Awards

References

Members of the Country Music Association
Living people
1994 births
American country singer-songwriters
Male models from Iowa
Record producers from Iowa
21st-century American singers